Morgan Community College (MCC) is a community college in Fort Morgan, Colorado. It is a member of the Colorado Community College System. The college is accredited by The Higher Learning Commission of the North Central Association of Colleges and Schools.

Campus
The main campus is located at 920 Barlow Road in Fort Morgan, close to the Fort Morgan Wal-Mart. The campus has six main buildings, all named after trees: Aspen Hall, Cedar Hall, Elm Hall, Spruce Hall, Cottonwood Hall, and Birch Hall.

Regional centers
The college serves a large area of Colorado's eastern plains and has regional centers in Bennett, Burlington, Limon, and Wray.

References

External links
Official website

Colorado Community College System
Buildings and structures in Morgan County, Colorado
Education in Morgan County, Colorado
Educational institutions established in 1970
1970 establishments in Colorado